Fidel Marcos Mane Ncogo Eyang is an Equatoguinean politician who served as a member of the Pan-African Parliament representing Equatorial Guinea and as the Minister Delegate of Energy for his home country.

References

Equatoguinean politicians
Members of the Pan-African Parliament from Equatorial Guinea
Living people